A special election for Isabela's 4th district seat in the House of Representatives of the Philippines was held on May 12, 2003. Held due to the death of Antonio Abaya, Giorgidi Aggabao won the special election, beating Abaya's widow Asuncion, to succeed him in the House of Representatives.

Campaign
Representative Antonio Abaya, who had represented the Isabela's 4th legislative district from 1987 to 1998, and since 2001, died on February 26, 2003. Abaya, who was term-limited in 1998, ran for mayor of Santiago but was beaten. He ran again for the seat (that includes Santiago) in 2001 and won.

As the Isabela Provincial Board passed the resolution urging the special election to be held, three people had been brought up as potential candidates. However, only Santiago mayor Jose Miranda (PDP–Laban) had declared his intention to run, relying on the support of Santiago and three other towns. Other potential candidates were former board member Giorgidi Aggabao, who had been beaten by Abaya in 2001 and was backed by Isabela governor Faustino Dy, Jr., and Asuncion Abaya, the late representative's widow, who is a medical doctor.

Later on, Miranda withdrew in favor of Dr. Abaya, who was considered to be the "sentimental favorite". Miranda's city of Santiago, the largest of the seven local government units in the district with about 60,000 votes, was expected to be the strongest source of votes for her. The mayors of the other towns all supported Aggabao, along with the Dy clan headed by the provincial governor.

Result

On election day, people handling Miranda's security were shot by unidentified men riding in motorcycles. The incident was described by the city election officer as "election-related." Other disturbances included the confrontation of Cordon Mayor Amado Vallejo, Jr. of two lawyers of the Abaya campaign who allegedly harassed poll watchers. According to unofficial counts, the towns of Echague, Cordon and Ramon all went to Aggabao, while Santiago went for Abaya, with Aggabao possessing a large overall margin.

On May 14, 2003, Aggabao was declared winner by the Commission on Elections (COMELEC). While the votes were being canvassed, Abaya's lawyers protested the process by walking out of the canvassing room. They alleged that some ballot boxes were switched on the trip from the polling places to the provincial capital of Ilagan. The Abayas held their own canvassing at the People's Coliseum in Santiago, with Edwin Uy, the 2nd district representative, attending. The official results had Aggabao winning at Cordon, San Isidro, Jones, San Agustin, Ramon and Echague. Abaya won at Santiago by around 5,000 votes and at Dinapigue by 62 votes. Aggabao was sworn into office by Governor Dy right after his proclamation. The tally of the Parish Pastoral Council for Responsible Voting (PPCRV), a COMELEC-accredited watchdog, and Abaya's camp had Abaya winning by 4,969 votes. Abaya had 46,072 votes while Aggabao had 41,103 votes. Aggabao brushed off the accusations, saying that he did not raise a fuss when he was beaten in 1991 and 2001.

Aftermath
Ilagan Bishop Sergio Utleg later issued a pastoral letter alleging the special election was the province's "most fraudulent". The pastoral letter was condemned by the isabela Provincial Board to the "strongest terms" and demanded that the bishop reconsider it. The bishop said, "My pastoral letter, contrary to the claim of the provincial board members, was based on verified facts and testimonies of people involved in the special elections," and reiterated for the nullification of the election results. Election officers of San Isidro and San Agustin claimed that Abaya won in their towns, with San Isidro's vote count for Aggabao surpassing the number of votes cast. COMELEC Chairmen Benjamin Abalos had formed a task force to investigate the alleged irregularities of the vote.

By 2013, Aggabao was in his third term in Congress, after losing to Miranda's brother Anthony in 2004; he won in 2007, and successfully defended his seat on the 2010 and 2013 election. Term-limited in 2016, his wife ran and won, defending the seat. Isabela was redistricted in time for the 2019 election, and Aggabao himself was defeated by newcomer Alyssa Sheena Tan.

References

2003 elections in the Philippines
Special elections to the Congress of the Philippines
Politics of Isabela (province)